Jacqueline "Jacqui" Nelson (formerly Morgan; born 26 May 1965) is a cyclist from New Zealand.

At the 1992 Summer Olympics at Barcelona she came 10th in the 3000 m pursuit. At the 1994 Commonwealth Games at Victoria, B.C. she came 2nd in the points race and 3rd in the 3000 m pursuit, winning silver and bronze medals. At the 1996 Summer Olympics at Atlanta she came 8th in the points race and 20th in the time trial.

References    
 Black Gold by Ron Palenski (2008, 2004 New Zealand Sports Hall of Fame, Dunedin) p. 69

External links  

Jacqui Nelson at the SR Sports Reference website

1965 births
Living people
New Zealand track cyclists
New Zealand female cyclists
Cyclists at the 1992 Summer Olympics
Cyclists at the 1996 Summer Olympics
Cyclists at the 1994 Commonwealth Games
Cyclists from Greater London
Olympic cyclists of New Zealand
Commonwealth Games silver medallists for New Zealand
Commonwealth Games bronze medallists for New Zealand
Commonwealth Games medallists in cycling
Medallists at the 1994 Commonwealth Games